Anthidium rotundum is a species of bee in the family Megachilidae, the leaf-cutter, carder, or mason bees.

Synonyms
Synonyms for this species include:
Anthidium (Proanthidium) rotundum Warncke, 1980

References

rotundum
Insects described in 1980